The Malcolm Moos Health Sciences Tower, informally known as the Moos Tower is a building on the East Bank of the University of Minnesota campus in Minneapolis, Minnesota. Inside Moos Tower are labs and faculty offices for the College of Dentistry and a Caribou Coffee with a designated study lounge. The entrance of Biomedical library can also be found in Moos Tower.

Moos Tower is the tallest building on the University of Minnesota Twin Cities campus. It is an example of Brutalist architecture.

History 
The building is named for Malcolm Moos, who was president of the University from 1967 to 1974. Moos Tower was designed by The Architects Collaborative as well as Cerny and Associates, HGA, and Setter Leach and Lindstrom in about 1970.

References

External links 
 Malcolm Moos Health Sciences Tower page on the University of Minnesota website

Brutalist architecture in Minnesota
Modernist architecture in Minnesota
Skyscrapers in Minneapolis
University of Minnesota